Red Dust and Spanish Lace was the breakthrough debut album by Acoustic Alchemy from 1987. Comprising nine tracks in total, the album spawned the radio-friendly single "Mr. Chow", which was described as "Chinese reggae". Other highlights include "Sarah Victoria", a re-recording of an early demo track, and the title track.

Track listing

Singles
"Mr. Chow"

Personnel 
Steel String Guitar - Nick Webb, John Parsons
Nylon String Guitar - Greg Carmichael
Bass - Werner Kopal
Keyboards - Rainer Bruninghaus
Drums -  Bert Smaak
Percussion - Mario Argandoña

References

Acoustic Alchemy albums
MCA Records albums
GRP Records albums
1987 albums